Abdülkerim Bardakcı (born 7 September 1994) is a Turkish footballer who plays as a defender for Galatasaray.

Club career
He made his Süper Lig debut on 17 August 2013 against Fenerbahçe.

Galatasaray
On 25 June 2022, an agreement was reached with professional football player Bardakcı and his club Konyaspor on the transfer of the player. Accordingly, a net transfer fee of 2,800,000 EUR will be paid to the former club of the player.

Honours

Individual
Süper Lig Left Center Back of the Year: 2021–22

References

External links
 
 
 

1994 births
Living people
People from Meram
Turkish footballers
Turkey under-21 international footballers
Turkey youth international footballers
Konyaspor footballers
Adana Demirspor footballers
Samsunspor footballers
Giresunspor footballers
Denizlispor footballers
Süper Lig players
TFF First League players
Association football defenders
Galatasaray S.K. footballers